Duncan Stewart (born 24 May 1984) is a Scottish professional golfer.

Stewart was born in Grantown-on-Spey, Scotland. He turned professional in 2007 and played on mini-tours, winning three events on the PGA EuroPro Tour from 2011 to 2012. In 2012, he finished second in the EuroPro Tour Order of Merit, to earn a place on the Challenge Tour for 2013. In his first full season, he finished in 20th place in the Challenge Tour rankings, and was able to play 10 events on the European Tour in 2014.

He won the 2016 Challenge de Madrid on the Challenge Tour.

Professional wins (4)

Challenge Tour wins (1)

PGA EuroPro Tour wins (3)

Team appearances
Professional
World Cup (representing Scotland): 2016

See also
2016 Challenge Tour graduates

References

External links

Scottish male golfers
European Tour golfers
Jacksonville University alumni
Sportspeople from Highland (council area)
1984 births
Living people